Shavur District is a district (bakhsh) in Shush County, Khuzestan Province, Iran. At the 2006 census, its population was 62,617, in 9,841 families.  The district has two cities: Alvan and Hosseinabad. The district has three rural districts (dehestan): Ahudasht Rural District, Seyyed Abbas Rural District, and Shavur Rural District.

References 

Shush County
Districts of Khuzestan Province